The National Lacrosse League Most Valuable Player Award is given annually to the NLL player who is considered to have contributed most to his team's success. The award winners are chosen by a vote of the league's coaches, general managers, and executives.

In 2006, the award was known as the "JetBlue National Lacrosse League MVP Award" and in 2007, it was known as the "Dodge Nitro National Lacrosse League MVP Award".

Past winners

Footnotes

Most Valuable Player
Most valuable player awards
Awards established in 1994
1994 establishments in Pennsylvania